Jack Salvatori (1901–1950) was an English/ Italian film director.

Selected filmography 
 De Sensatie van de Toekomst (1931)
 The Doctor's Secret (1931)

References

Bibliography 
 Waldman, Harry. Missing Reels: Lost Films of American and European Cinema. McFarland, 2000.

External links 
 

1901 births
1950 deaths
Film directors from Rome
Italian emigrants to the United Kingdom

https://phoebekashton.wixsite.com/jacksalvatori